XHPSEN-FM is a radio station on 96.9 FM in Ensenada, Baja California, Mexico. It is owned by Radiópolis and carries its Los 40 pop format.

History
XHPSEN was awarded in the IFT-4 radio auction of 2017. Televisa Radio paid 32 million pesos. It came to air in October 2019 and Los 40 format had previously on XHAT-FM 101.1 before breakup with Televisa Radio and Audiorama.

References

External links

Radio stations in Baja California
Radio stations established in 2019
2019 establishments in Mexico
Radiópolis